The Hundred Flowers Award for Best Co-produced Film was first awarded by the China Film Association in 1994.

1990s

References

Co-produced Film